Thetford Grammar School is an independent co-educational school in Thetford, Norfolk, England. The school might date back to the 7th century, which would make it one of the oldest schools in the United Kingdom.

History
The school website conjectures its origin traces back to 631, and through its Roll of Headmasters to 1114. The Independent Schools Inspectorate assert in their 2012 report that "The school was originally founded in the 10th Century" but without any evidence provided.  It appears to have ceased from around 1496 until its refoundation from the will of Sir Richard Fulmerston in 1566. The refoundation was confirmed by an Act of Parliament in 1610. Part of the school is built on the site of a thirteenth-century Dominican Friary (Blackfriars, Thetford), which may have been built on, and incorporated parts of, a Norman cathedral. This building, now known as "Old School", comprised the entire school for about 300 years, and is where the lawyer Roger North and the political activist Thomas Paine were educated.

In 1998 archaeologists from the television programme Time Team excavated at the school for three days in search of the Norman cathedral of Herbert Losinga, which was only located at Thetford for twenty years or so, before relocating to Norwich. They did not find any Norman stone building, perhaps because the short-lived cathedral was a re-used Anglo-Saxon wooden church which has not survived.

The school developed rapidly in the 1880s, and in 1888 Thetford Grammar School for Girls was built alongside the existing Grammar School. The school became a Voluntary controlled school in 1944, and remained in the state sector until 1981 when it regained its independent status. The original boys' school and the girls' grammar school merged in 1975 to form a new coeducational school.

Since 2017 the school has been owned by China Financial Services Holdings, a Hong Kong-based company.

Notable former pupils

Jim Bacon, weather forecaster
 Francis Blomefield, topographer and historian
 Harold Chapman, former orthodontist
 C. H. Chapman, cartoonist 
 Frederick Charles Frank, theoretical physicist
 Thomas Howard, Duke of Norfolk
 Allan Noel Minns, physician during World War I
 Roger North, musicologist, Attorney General from 1688
 Thomas Paine, American revolutionary and author
 Alfred Neobard Palmer, chemist and historian
James Pattinson, author and writer

References

External links
 Thetford Grammar School
 Profile on the Independent Schools Council website
 Independent Schools Inspectorate Report

Private schools in Norfolk
7th-century establishments in England
Educational institutions established in the 7th century
Thetford